Dino Morelli (born June 6, 1973, Ballymoney, County Antrim, Northern Ireland), is a former racing driver who competed sporadically in Formula 3000 between 1995 and 2001.

Career
Morelli began racing in karts in the late 1980s before joining Irish Formula Ford in 1990, and later British Formula Ford in 1991. By 1994, he was racing in British Formula 3 where he finished 7th in the championship. He joined Omegaland to compete in the first two rounds of the 1995 International Formula 3000 season. He retired from both races. In 1996, he joined Coloni to race in Italian Formula 3, before returning to Formula 3000 in 1997. Driving for DKS Racing, Morelli's season started well finishing 5th in the opening race at Silverstone. He would secure his first, and only, Formula 3000 podium at Helsinki.  At the next round in Germany, Morelli was involved in a major accident with Gareth Rees and Cyril Sauvage which saw his car launched over the barriers. Morelli was airlifted to hospital, suffering lacerations on the face and complex fractures to his feet. He did not race again in 1997, but did finish in 12th position in the championship.

In 1998, he returned to the Formula 3000 and completed four races with a best finish of 8th at Monaco. In 1999 he represented Coloni Motorsport in both International F3000 and Italian Formula 3000. In Italy, Morelli completed two races finishing 4th at Misano and winning the final round of the season at Imola. Scoring 13 points he finished 6th overall in Italian F3000 that season.  In International F3000, his best result was 10th at Spa.

As he headed into 2000, Morelli completed two International F3000 races for WRT and Durango. Alongside this he also raced in the Sports Racing World Cup completing three rounds. At Donington Park, he won with team mate Richard Lyons. In 2001, he completed five races for Team Astromega with a best finish of 7th place. He retired from both the Monaco and British rounds of the championship after crashes.

Racing record

Career summary

Complete International Formula 3000 results
(key) (Races in bold indicate pole position; races in italics indicate fastest lap.)

Personal life
Morelli is based in Portrush, and runs a successful business. His family were the founders of the Morelli ice cream parlour business in Northern Ireland.

References

Racing drivers from Northern Ireland
International Formula 3000 drivers
British Formula 3000 Championship drivers
1973 births
Living people
People from Ballymoney
Formula Ford drivers
Italian British racing drivers
People from Northern Ireland of Italian descent
Team Astromega drivers
Scuderia Coloni drivers
P1 Motorsport drivers
Durango drivers